Pope Innocent IX (20 July 1519 – 30 December 1591), born Giovanni Antonio Facchinetti, was head of the Catholic Church and ruler of the Papal States from 29 October to 30 December 1591.

Prior to his short papacy, he had been a canon lawyer, diplomat, and chief administrator during the reign of Pope Gregory XIV (r. 1590–1591).

Biography

Early life and priesthood
Giovanni Antonio Facchinetti, whose family came from Crodo, in the diocese of Novara, northern Italy, was born in Bologna on 20 July 1519. He was the son of Antonio Facchinetti and Francesca Cini.

He studied at the University of Bologna - which was pre-eminent in jurisprudence — where he obtained a doctorate in both civil and canon law in 1544. He was later ordained to the priesthood on 11 March 1544 and was appointed a canon of the church of Saints Gervasio and Protasio of Domodossola in 1547.

He travelled to Rome and he became the secretary to Cardinal Nicolò Ardinghelli before entering the service of Cardinal Alessandro Farnese, brother of the Duke of Parma and grandson of Pope Paul III (1534–1549), one of the great patrons of the time. The cardinal, who was the Archbishop of Avignon, sent Facchinetti there as his ecclesiastical representative and subsequently recalled him to the management of his affairs at Parma, where he was acting governor of the city, from 1556 to 1558. He was also made the Referendary of the Apostolic Signatura in 1559 and held that post for a year.

Episcopate and cardinalate
In 1560, Facchinetti was named as the Bishop of Nicastro, in Calabria, and in 1562 was present at the Council of Trent. He was the first bishop to actually reside in the diocese in three decades. Pope Pius V (1566–1572) sent him as papal nuncio to Venice in 1566 to further the papal alliance with Spain and Venice against the Turks, which ultimately resulted in the victory of Lepanto in 1571. He was recalled from Venice in 1572 and was made the Prior Commendatario of S. Andrea di Carmignano in the diocese of Padua from 1576 to 1587.

Relinquishing his see to pursue his career in Rome in 1575 and also because of health reasons, he was named the Titular Latin Patriarch of Jerusalem in 1572. He occupied that post until he was made a cardinal.

Pope Gregory XIII made him a cardinal on 12 December 1583 as the Cardinal-Priest of Santi Quattro Coronati and he was to receive the red hat and title on 9 January 1584. Pope Gregory XIV made him the Prefect of the Apostolic Signatura in 1591.

Papacy

Even before Pope Gregory XIV died, Spanish and anti-Spanish factions were electioneering for the next pope. Philip II of Spain's (r. 1556–1598) high-handed interference at the previous conclave was not forgotten: he had barred all but seven cardinals. This time the Spanish party in the College of Cardinals did not go so far, but they still controlled a majority, and after a quick conclave they raised Facchinetti to the papal chair as Pope Innocent IX. It took three ballots to elect him as pope. Facchinetti received 24 votes on 28 October but was not successful in that ballot to be elected as pope. He received 28 votes on 29 October in the second ballot while the third saw him prevail. Facchinetti took his papal name to honor Pope Innocent III.

The cardinal protodeacon Andreas von Austria crowned Innocent IX as pontiff on 3 November 1591. He elevated two cardinals to the cardinalate in the only papal consistory of his papacy on 18 December 1591.

Mindful of the origin of his success, Innocent IX supported, during his two months' pontificate, the cause of Philip II and the Catholic League against Henry IV of France (r. 1589–1610) in the  French Wars of Religion (1562–1598), where a papal army was in the field. His death, however, prevented the realisation of Innocent IX's schemes.

His grandnephew Giovanni Antonio Cardinal Facchinetti de Nuce, Jr., was one of two cardinals appointed during the weeks of Innocent IX's pontificate. A later member of the cardinalate was his great-grandnephew Cesare Facchinetti (made a cardinal in 1643).

Death
On 18 December, the pope made a pilgrimage of Rome's seven pilgrimage churches, despite being ill, and caught a cold as a result. This became a heavy cough combined with a fever that led to his death shortly after he received the Extreme Unction.

Innocent IX died in the early morning of 30 December 1591. He was buried in the Vatican grottoes in a simple tomb.

See also
Cardinals created by Innocent IX
Popes named Innocent

References

External links
 
The Cardinals
Cravegna official website (in Italian)

1519 births
1591 deaths
Apostolic Nuncios to the Republic of Venice
Italian popes
Latin Patriarchs of Jerusalem
Participants in the Council of Trent
People from the Province of Verbano-Cusio-Ossola
Popes
16th-century popes
Burials at St. Peter's Basilica